Bainton Gate railway station was a short lived railway "station" in the Soke of Peterborough (now in Cambridgeshire) on the Syston and Peterborough Railway serving the village of Bainton. It was located at the level crossing on the Bainton to Tallington road. The crossing keeper's cottage survives and is now a private house. According to The Syston and Peterborough website, this cottage doubled as the station building. The station closed on 1 August 1856.

References

 

Disused railway stations in Cambridgeshire
Transport in Peterborough
Buildings and structures in Peterborough
Railway stations in Great Britain opened in 1846
Railway stations in Great Britain closed in 1856
Former Midland Railway stations
1846 establishments in England